Théophile Marie Brébant (24 May 1889 – 20 February 1965) was a French Army officer during World War I and World War II. He ended his career in 1946 with the rank of colonel.

Career
Brébant served from 23 July 1908 to 14 June 1946 in the French Army.

During his career he belonged to the following regiments:  
 48th line infantry regiment
 1st Foreign Regiment
 3rd Foreign Infantry Regiment
 41st Infantry Regiment 
 146th Infantry Regiment fortress
 117th Infantry Regiment 

During World War I, Brébant  participated in the First Battle of the Marne and the Battle of Verdun.

During the Second World War from 1939 to 1940, he participated in the Battle of France. Then he was a prisoner in Germany in Oflag IV-D (Hoyerswerda, Lower Silesia).

Honour
A street of Guingamp (France) is now called "Col. Brébant" to honour him. It is planned to name a street where a green space in his name at Le Mans (France).

Awards
Commander of the Légion d'honneur on 17 January 1952
Officer of the Légion d'honneur on 13 December 1938
Knight of the Légion d'honneur on 24 July 1918
French Croix de guerre 1914-1918  (1 bronze palm, 1 gilt star, 1 silver star, 1 bronze star)
French Croix de guerre 1939-1945 (2 bronze palms)
French Croix de guerre des TOE (1 silver star)
French Croix du combattant
Colonial Medal with bar "Morocco"
Medal commemorating the war 1914–1918
World War I Victory Medal
Medal commemorating the war of 1939–1945 with staple France
Wounded military insignia with two red stars (wounded twice)
Medal of La Marne
Medal of Verdun
Medal commemorating the Battle of the Somme (1940)

1889 births
1965 deaths
People from Guingamp
French Army officers
French military personnel of World War I
French military personnel of World War II
World War II prisoners of war held by Germany
French prisoners of war in World War II
Recipients of the Croix de Guerre 1914–1918 (France)
Recipients of the Croix de Guerre 1939–1945 (France)
Commandeurs of the Légion d'honneur
Officers of the French Foreign Legion
Officiers of the Légion d'honneur
Chevaliers of the Légion d'honneur
People of the Rif War